Hungary chose Gjon Delhusa, with the song "Fortuna", to be their representative at the 1996 Eurovision Song Contest. However, Hungary was one of seven countries which failed to qualify for the Eurovision final from a pre-qualifying round, so they were not represented in Oslo.

Before Eurovision

National final 
The national final was organised by broadcaster Magyar Televízió (MTV) and was held at their studios in Budapest, hosted by István Vágó. 14 songs took part with the winner being chosen by voting from five regional juries, who each awarded 10-7-5-3-1 to their top five songs.

At Eurovision 
In 1996, for the only time in Eurovision history, an audio-only qualifying round (from which hosts Norway were exempt) was held on 20 March as 29 countries wished to participate in the final but the European Broadcasting Union had set a limit of 22 (plus Norway). The countries occupying the bottom seven places after the pre-qualifier would be unable to take part in the main contest. After the voting, "Fortuna" had received 26 points, tying with Finland for the final 22nd qualifying position, however the spot was awarded to Finland because the country attained a higher top score, bringing Hungary's participation in 1996 to a premature end.

Voting

References 

1996
Countries in the Eurovision Song Contest 1996
Eurovision